Bastasi is a village in the municipality of Banja Luka, Republika Srpska, Bosnia and Herzegovina.

Demographics
Ethnic groups in the village include:
165 Serbs (90.30%)
12 Bosniaks (7.27%)
2 Croats (1.21%)
2 Others (1.21%)

References

Villages in Republika Srpska
Populated places in Banja Luka